Jorge Xavier Murrieta Fernández (born 23 November 1985) is a sailor from Mexico.

Murrieta is North American Champion in two different classes: J/24 and Snipe. He won the 2009 J/24 North Americans, hosted by the Club Náutico Valle de Bravo in México, and the 2010 Snipe North American Championship hosted by the Ponce Yacht and Fishing Club in Puerto Rico.

Pan American Games
 Bronze medal at Rio de Janeiro 2007 in the Snipe class.

References

1985 births
Living people
Mexican male sailors (sport)
Sailors at the 2007 Pan American Games
Sailors at the 2011 Pan American Games
Snipe class sailors
Sportspeople from the State of Mexico
Pan American Games medalists in sailing
Pan American Games bronze medalists for Mexico
Medalists at the 2007 Pan American Games